The 2013–14 A-League National Youth League (Also known as the Foxtel National Youth League for sponsorship reasons) was the sixth season of the Australian A-League National Youth League competition. The season ran alongside the 2013–14 A-League season. The schedule was released on 10 September 2013.

Teams

Standings

Positions by round

NOTES:
 Melbourne Heart were tied with Sydney FC at the end of Round 1, as were Brisbane Roar with Melbourne Victory, Adelaide United with Central Coast Mariners and Perth Glory with Western Sydney Wanderers.
 Central Coast Mariners were tied with Western Sydney Wanderers at the end of Round 2.

Table of results

Matches
Round 1

Round 2

Round 3

Round 4

Round 5

Round 6

Round 7

Round 8

Round 9

Round 10

Round 11

Round 12

Round 13

Round 14

Round 15

Round 16

Round 17

Round 18

Season statistics

Top scorers

References

External links
Official National Youth League website

2013–14 A-League season
A-League National Youth League seasons